Ramena is a town and commune in Madagascar.  It belongs to the district of Antsiranana II, which is a part of Diana Region.  The population of the commune was estimated to be approximately 4,430 in 2009.  Only primary schooling is available.

Ramena is also the most popular beach of Diego Suarez from which it can be reached by an asphalted road in a distance of 18 km.

Localities 
 Montagne des Français
 Ampombiantambo
Nosy Lonjo

References and notes 

Populated places in Diana Region